Westminster High School is a public secondary school (grades 9-12) operated by Westminster Public Schools in Westminster, Adams County, Colorado, United States.

At the end of 1996, it was  announced that all incoming freshmen in the '08-'09 school year, as well as all sophomores in the district who currently attended either Ranum or Westminster High School, would be attending the current Westminster High School campus until the new building was finished, for the '10-'11 school year. The district then announced the new school name would also be Westminster High School and the new school colors would be teal, black, and silver, with the wolves as a mascot. The new building location is on almost the same lot as the current building. Features include three multi-purpose basketball courts, an indoor track, a lecture hall, and a 725-seat theatre, all within a  building.

Demographics
Hispanic 62.2%
White 26.2%
African American 1.8%
Asian 8.7%
Native American 1.1%

Academies
The school is divided into five separate academies from which students select an area of focus.

Architecture, Construction, and Engineering Academy 
Global Business Academy 
Health and Biomedical Academy 
Liberal Arts Academy 
Visual and Performing Arts Academy

History
The original Westminster High School was located at 7300 Lowell, which later became the Career Enrichment Park when Westminster High School moved from 73rd and Lowell to its current location in 1976. When originally established in 1949, the school colors were blue and white, and the mascot was a Warrior.

See also
Adams County School District 50
List of high schools in Colorado

References

External links
 
 Adams County School District 50

Public high schools in Colorado
Westminster, Colorado
Schools in Adams County, Colorado
Educational institutions established in 1949
International Baccalaureate schools in Colorado
1949 establishments in Colorado